Broadmeadow is the geographic center of Newcastle city. Its main commercial hub is located at the "Nineways". In 2016, it had a population of approximately 1,600.

History

Origins
Broadmeadow was originally part of the Newcastle Pasturage Reserve of 648 hectares. It developed around the Great Northern Railway, the road to Newcastle's western suburbs and the construction of the Sydney to Newcastle Railway in the 1880s.

Nineways is a major intersection at Broadmeadow, originally constructed as a landscaped garden in the centre of a roundabout at the intersection of nine roads/tramlines that converge there, the area was later reconstructed to have a set of traffic lights connected to only four roads. The other roads that accessed the roundabout were variously partly or fully closed off.

At Nineways stood the Century Theatre, rebuilt by Hoyts Theatres after World War II, with vast foyers on two floors and seating 1600, as one of Newcastle's premier theatres for stage and screen. It was often a venue for symphony orchestra concerts after the closure of the city's Victoria Theatre, but the exodus from cinemas because of television caused its closure in the early 1970s. It was said to have sustained severe structural damage during the 1989 earthquake, and was subsequently quickly demolished, amidst great controversy.

Railways
The Broadmeadow railway station is situated close by and, before the construction of the Newcastle Interchange at Wickham, was once considered as the site for Newcastle's official transport interchange following truncation of the Newcastle railway line. Between Adamstown and Broadmeadow railway stations there is a large marshalling yard that opened in 1938. Adjoining this marshalling yard was Broadmeadow Locomotive Depot which was the second largest steam locomotive depot in the state, and served the last mainline steam locomotives in service on the New South Wales Government Railways in 1973. The depot was then used for the stabling & servicing of Diesel locomotives until the depot was closed in 1994.

Facilities

There are two high schools in Broadmeadow: Hunter School of Performing Arts, whose students have to pass a performance trial, and Merewether High School. The latter is the only academically selective secondary school in the Newcastle region.

Broadmeadow is home to the Newcastle Regional Showground, which holds the Newcastle Regional Show and has the Newcastle Entertainment Centre, which hosts concerts and other large-scale performances. The Hunter Pirates basketball team previously played home games at the Entertainment Centre before being relocated to Singapore.

District Park within Broadmeadow has been the base of the Westpac Life Saver Rescue Helicopter Service since 1973.

Broadmeadow contains the Newcastle Racecourse, situated in Darling Street. 

Broadmeadow Shopping Centre (formerly known as Newcastle Central) has a Ritchies Supa IGA and is complemented by ten speciality shops.

Demographics
In the 2016 Census, there were 1,592 people in Broadmeadow.  83.1% of people were born in Australia and 83.9% of people spoke only English at home. The most common responses for religion were No Religion 40.0%, Catholic 19.8% and Anglican 13.5%.

Heritage listings 
Broadmeadow has a number of heritage-listed sites, including:
 Premiers and Railway Commissioners Rail Car Collection
 Main Northern railway: Broadmeadow Railway Locomotive Depot

References

Suburbs of Newcastle, New South Wales